Geoffrey Leyden "Chief" Keith (1937–1975), played first-class cricket for Somerset, Hampshire and Western Province.

Somerset cricketer
born at Winchester, Hampshire on 19 November 1937, Keith made his first-class debut for Somerset against Cambridge University in May 1959, scoring 40 in his first innings. He played only one further first-team match that year, but in 1960 was given a run of 10 matches in the first half of the season. But his highest score was only 48 in the match against Gloucestershire at Bath, and his bowling was not used at all. After three unsuccessful games in the early part of the 1961 season, he left Somerset at the end of the season and joined Hampshire for the 1962 season.

Hampshire career
In his first match for his new county, Keith scored 82 and 12 not out against Oxford University, but though it was a new highest score for him it was also his only first-class match of the 1962 season. He played only three matches in 1963, but the long-standing opening batsman Jimmy Gray was available for only the second half of the 1964 season, and Keith stood in for him for the first two months, opening with Roy Marshall, though he failed to retain his place for long once Gray was available again. In the most prolific season of his career, he scored 653 runs with a highest of 75 and an average of 21.76.

There were more matches but a different batting position in 1965: Barry Reed and Mike Barnard became Marshall's more regular opening partners, while Keith resumed batting in the middle order. His aggregate for the season at 561 runs was lower than in 1964, but his average had improved to 26.75 and the season included the only century of his career, an unbeaten 101 in the match against the South African touring side. His little used off-spin also got its best reward in the 1965 season, with four wickets for 49 runs in Gloucestershire's first innings in the match at Bristol.

In 1966, however, Keith went back to being a bit-part player in the Hampshire side, playing only seven matches and making only 86 runs in them. He had a further good run in the first team in the first months of the 1967 season, and made 53 against Sussex before losing his place. Regaining it with an innings of 85 against Oxford University, he lost it again only two games later, and, with younger players such as David Turner and Keith Wheatley seizing their chances, he was not picked again. He left Hampshire at the end of the season to move to South Africa.

South Africa and after
Keith played twice for Western Province in the B section of the Currie Cup, but made little impact. He returned to Hampshire to become the county's cricket coach in 1971, and played and captained the second eleven from 1971 to 1975. The levels of fitness and the high standard of fielding were cited as among the reasons why an unfancied Hampshire won its second County Championship title in 1973.

Early death
Keith died at Southampton on 26 December 1975 from a heart attack aged 38. His obituary in Wisden states: "His early death was particularly tragic as he was a man who took great pains to keep himself physically fit."

External links
Geoff Keith at www.cricketarchive.com.

References

1937 births
1975 deaths
English cricketers
Somerset cricketers
Hampshire cricketers
Western Province cricketers